Augustus Porter Hascall (June 24, 1800 – June 27, 1872) was an American politician, surveyor, lawyer, judge, and a U.S. Representative from New York.

Early life
Born in Hinsdale, Massachusetts, Hascall moved to Le Roy, New York, in 1815 and attended public and private schools.  He engaged in surveying and studied law. He was admitted to the bar on March 10, 1852, and commenced practice in Le Roy, New York.

Career
A Justice of the Peace and Town Supervisor, Hascall also served as Judge of the Court of Common Pleas and for more than thirty years was a member of the board of trustees of the Le Roy Female Seminary and Ingham University.

Elected as a Whig to the Thirty-second Congress, Hascall served as United States Representative for the 33rd district of New York from March 4, 1851, to March 3, 1853. After his term, he resumed the practice of law. He was trustee of the village of Le Roy in 1858.

Death
Hascall died in Le Roy, New York, on June 27, 1872 (age 72 years, 3 days). He is interred at Myrtle Street Cemetery, Le Roy, New York.

Family life
On June 25, 1827, Hascall married Mary Elizabeth Hinsdale who died on March 15, 1842, and they had seven children. His second marriage was to Malvina H. Simmons on April 23, 1844. They had three children.

References

External links

 

1800 births
1872 deaths
New York (state) lawyers
New York (state) state court judges
People from Hinsdale, Massachusetts
Whig Party members of the United States House of Representatives from New York (state)
People from Le Roy, New York
19th-century American politicians
19th-century American judges
19th-century American lawyers